Baashe Delta  (born 10 May 2002) is a Somali–German singer and songwriter. In 2019, he secured a record deal with Kkurbo Studio. Delta is best known for his popular tune "Najma," a semi-R&B/pop song that became a national anthem and topped numerous African music charts.

Awards and nominations
•	2021 Somali Music Awards – Best Music Video, Germany

References

2002 births
Living people